Statistics of Belgian First Division in the 1928–29 season.

Overview

It was contested by 14 teams, and Royal Antwerp FC won the championship.

League standings

Results

Championship play-off

References

Belgian Pro League seasons
Belgian First Division, 1928-29
1928–29 in Belgian football